Melon Collie and the Infinite Radness: Part Two is a five-track EP released by Canadian indie group Tokyo Police Club on September 23, 2016. The band released the single "My House" on September 2, 2016, to promote the EP.

Track listing

Personnel 
Adapted from liner notes.

Musicians

 Greg Alsop – songwriting, drums
 Josh Hook – songwriting, electric guitar
 Dave Monks – songwriting, lead vocals, bass guitar; producer (track: 1)
 Graham Wright – songwriting, keyboards, backing vocals, guitar, air horn
 Rostam Batmanglij – keyboards, backing vocals, producer, mixing (track: 1)

Technical

 Jon Drew – engineer (tracks: 1, 3 to 5)
 Nick Rowe – engineer (track: 1)
 Doug Boehm – engineer (track: 2)
 Rocky Gallo – engineer (track: 3)
 Rob Schnapf – mixing 
 Brian Rosemeyer – assistant mixing
 John DeBold – assistant mixing
 Mark Chalecki – mastering

Art and management

 Chris Schoonover – photography

 Todd Goldstein – artwork
 Tim Cohan – lettering
 Richard Cohen – management

References 

Tokyo Police Club albums
2016 EPs